Colin Meldrum (26 November 1941 – 4 October 2019) was a Scottish football player and manager.

Career
Born in Glasgow, Meldrum played as a left back for Arsenal, Watford, Reading, Cambridge United, Hillingdon Borough and Workington. At Reading, he was Player of the Season in the 1963–64 and 1964–65 seasons.

Meldrum also worked as the player-manager of Hillingdon Borough and Workington, coach of York City, and manager of Stafford Rangers.

Honours
Reading
Player of the Season: 1964, 1965

References

1941 births
2019 deaths
Scottish footballers
Scottish football managers
Arsenal F.C. players
Watford F.C. players
Reading F.C. players
Cambridge United F.C. players
Hillingdon Borough F.C. players
Workington A.F.C. players
English Football League players
Workington A.F.C. managers
Stafford Rangers F.C. managers
York City F.C. non-playing staff
Footballers from Glasgow
Association football fullbacks